A Drumkeeper is a common name for someone in a native ceremony who has been passed a traditional sacred drum, or instructed in how to make and use one.  These can include water drums, hand drums, and larger drums used during ceremonies such as pow wows, sundances and sweatlodges.  Often in Anishinaabe ceremonies, the water drum is passed along from one generation to the next, and only a few elders keep these drums, and only they use them for important ceremonies.

In Osage culture, a Drumkeeper can be chosen every few years. A drumkeeper is chosen during the four-day I'N-Lon-Schka ceremonial dance in June.

References

Religious occupations of the indigenous peoples of North America
Ojibwe culture
Anishinaabe culture